The 1995 Army Cadets football team was an American football team that represented the United States Military Academy in the 1995 NCAA Division I-A football season. In their fifth season under head coach Bob Sutton, the Cadets compiled a 5–5–1 record and outscored their opponents by a combined total of 325 to 211.  In the annual Army–Navy Game, the Cadets defeated Navy, 14–13.

Schedule

Roster

Game summaries

Navy

References

Army
Army Black Knights football seasons
Army Cadets football